Adam Mikael Sven Ståhl (born 8 October 1994) is a Swedish professional footballer who plays as a left winger for Mjällby in Allsvenskan.

Professional career
Ståhl begun his senior footballing career with Norrby IF, and helped them get promoted into the Superettan. He made his Superettan debut for Norrby in a 1–1 tie with Trelleborgs FF on 17 April 2017.

Ståhl signed a two and a half-year contract with Kardemir Karabükspor on 6 January 2018, after a successful season with Norrby IF. Ståhl made his professional debut for Kardemir Karabükspor in a 5-0 Süper Lig loss to İstanbul Başakşehir F.K. on 29 January 2018.

On 11 August 2018, after being released by Kardemir Karabükspor, Ståhl signed with Dalkurd FF in Allsvenskan, Sweden's first tier.

Ståhl signed a 3-year deal with IK Sirius Fotboll on the 21 January 2019.

In January 2022 Ståhl signed a deal with Mjällby reaching into 2024.

References

External links
 
 Fotbolltransfers Profile
 
 
 Kardemir Karabukspor Profile

1994 births
Living people
Swedish footballers
Norrby IF players
Kardemir Karabükspor footballers
Dalkurd FF players
IK Sirius Fotboll players
Mjällby AIF players
Süper Lig players
Superettan players
Allsvenskan players
Ettan Fotboll players
Association football midfielders
Swedish expatriate footballers
Swedish expatriate sportspeople in Turkey
Expatriate footballers in Turkey
People from Borås
Sportspeople from Västra Götaland County